Port Columbus may mean:

The National Civil War Naval Museum at Port Columbus, an attraction in Columbus, Georgia
Port Columbus (Georgia) on the Chattahoochee River in Columbus, Georgia
Port Columbus International Airport, the former name for John Glenn Columbus International Airport in Columbus, Ohio